The 1976 Swedish motorcycle Grand Prix was the eighth round of the 1976 Grand Prix motorcycle racing season. It took place on 25 July 1976 at the Scandinavian Raceway.

500cc classification

Footnotes

250 cc classification

125 cc classification

50 cc classification

References

Swedish motorcycle Grand Prix
Swedish
Motorcycle Grand Prix